Elaine Ziemba (born ) is a Canadian former politician in Ontario, Canada. She was a New Democratic Party member of the Legislative Assembly of Ontario from 1990 to 1995, and served as a cabinet minister in the government of Bob Rae.

Background
Ziemba was born and raised in the west end Roncesvalles neighbourhood. Her family owned a television store. She was executive director of the St. Clair West Meals-on-Wheels and president of the Metro Toronto Federation of Community-based Seniors' Agencies, and was strongly involved in activities involving Toronto's Polish community.  She also wrote articles on the history of canoeing in Canada during the 1980s. Her brother-in-law, Ed Ziemba, represented the Toronto riding of High Park—Swansea for the Ontario NDP from 1975 to 1981.

Politics
Ziemba ran for Toronto city council in the 1980 election in Ward 2. She placed fourth behind Tony Ruprecht and Ben Grys.

Provincial politics
She ran for the Ontario legislature in the 1985 provincial election, but lost to Progressive Conservative incumbent Yuri Shymko by 330 votes.  She ran again in the 1987 provincial election and finished third, behind Shymko and the winner, Liberal David Fleet.

The NDP won a majority government in the 1990 provincial election and Ziemba was elected over Fleet by over 3,000 votes.  On October 1, 1990, Ziemba was appointed Minister of Citizenship with responsibility for disabled persons and seniors.

In 1992, Ziemba's department passed an "Advocacy Act" enshrining the right of consumers to accurate information. In 1996 the Tories repealed the legislation.

Employment equity
Ziemba's most controversial ministerial decisions involved the issue of employment equity. She was given control of this file at the beginning of the Rae government's mandate, and she hired Juanita Westmoreland-Traoré as an employment equity commissioner to draft legislation on the subject. Westmoreland-Traoré said that the purpose of employment equity was to remove cultural biases that prevent certain segments of society from getting good jobs. She said, "Targets for racial minorities, women, aboriginals and the disabled is the best way to "even the playing field" that's favored white males."

Premier Bob Rae argued that employment equity was a goal set out in the Liberal-NDP accord in 1985 but the Peterson government failed to act on it. He said the NDP were firmly opposed to quotas and that any law would be implemented gradually. Critics of the policy argued that the legislation would inevitably lead to quotas. Alan Borovoy of the Canadian Civil Liberties Association said, "We are concerned that a requirement of numerical goals could produce unfairness."

The Employment Equity Act was passed in December 1993 with implementation set to start on September 1, 1994. Opponents of the bill argued that while the goal of employment equity was laudable, the result of the bill would be discrimination against one section of society in favour another. Some felt the bill would encourage racist elements of society. In 1995 after the NDP defeat, the governing Tories under Mike Harris tabled the Job Quotas Repeal Act which removed all of the work done by Ziemba.
 
The NDP were defeated in the 1995 provincial election, and Ziemba lost to Progressive Conservative candidate Derwyn Shea by fewer than 2,000 votes.

Cabinet positions

Electoral record

References

External links
 

1942 births
Canadian people of Polish descent
Women government ministers of Canada
Ontario New Democratic Party MPPs
Politicians from Toronto
Living people
Members of the Executive Council of Ontario
Women MPPs in Ontario